Anton Maria Salvini  (1653–1729) was an Italian naturalist and classicist who lived in Tuscany. An accomplished linguist, he is noted for his translations of texts in Latin, Greek, and Hebrew.

Biography
Born in Florence to a prominent family, his brother Salvino Salvini grew up to be also a writer. At the age of 12, he began studies under Jesuits. Among his fellow students was future cardinal Giovanni Battista Tolomei and future bishop of Florence, Ansaldo Ansaldi (1651–1719). In 1669, he was sent to the University of Pisa to study jurisprudence. He became a member of the Accademia degli Apatisti, founded by Agostino Coltellini (1613-1693). At Pisa, he studied under Bartolomeo Cheti. In 1679, he graduated with a doctorate in canon and civil law. He was sent to work under a lawyer Andrea Poltri, but passed the time reading and studying texts. He was not functioning well or interested in being a lawyer, but he gained among some the reputation of a excessively erudite polyglot and polymath, profusely quoting the ancient footnote to any new statement. Italian writers of the 19th-century, like Foscoli and Settembrini were strongly repulsed by his urge to base knowledge on recondite and archaic sources. Francesco Redi is said to have commented that: And from a full glasses and overflowing / in such sweet demeanor my heart he touches / That to laugh  again will not be enough / He, my Salvini, who has so much tongue in his mouth.
 
He befriended Benedetto Menzini and Carlo Dati, who had also studied under Redi. With the support of Cardinal Leopoldo de Medici, in 1677 he was appointed professor of Greek language at the Florentine Accademia. He was soon admitted as member of the prestigious Accademia della Crusca. In 1680, he took to the vestments of a secular abbott. He became a prolific translator of Greco-Roman classics.

On his death, his library and documents were left to the Biblioteca Riccardiana. Among Salvini's pupils were Antonio Francesco Gori and Giovanni Lami. Salvinia, a genus of floating fern commemorates his name.

References

Italian naturalists
Italian classical scholars
17th-century Italian writers
1653 births
1729 deaths